Daşkəsən (also, Daşgəsən, Dashkesan) is a village in the Jabrayil Rayon of Azerbaijan. It is currently uninhabited.

Notable natives 
 
 Vugar Huseynov — National Hero of Azerbaijan.

References 

Populated places in Jabrayil District